The New Way Forward Act is a proposed legislation introduced in the U.S. Senate and House on December 10, 2019 by Jesús "Chuy" García, which focuses on immigration reform. The bill would repeal sections 1325 and 1326 of the immigration law to decriminalize unauthorized border crossing whilst maintaining civil deportation procedures. The bill intends to give immigration judges discretion when deciding immigration claims for immigrants with criminal records in the United States, changes immigration enforcement by ending mandatory detention in specific cases and intends to remove private detention centers for immigrants.

The bill was reintroduced in the 117th congress in 2021.

Background 
The bill's supporters have introduced a bill roughly divided into seven parts.

The bill aims to close private prisons or private detention centers for immigrants beginning three years after the bill's possible enactment.
The Department of Homeland Security officials including Immigrations and Customs Enforcement (ICE) would be prohibited from using national origin, race, ethnicity, or fluency in English when interrogating immigrants.
Redefines the categories of "serious crimes" which currently bar immigrants from qualifying for asylum. Only felonies with a jail sentence of at least five years would be prohibited from applying for asylum.
Repeals or limits laws which limits the discretion immigration judges', instead allowing the immigration judge an exercise of discretion suitable in pursuit of humanitarian purposes, assuring family unity, or when it is in the public interest.
There would be a prohibition on the involvement of state/local law enforcement involvement in the  apprehension, investigation, transport, or detention of undocumented immigrants.
Illegal border crossing would be enforced under civil rather than criminal law procedures.

Support 
The has received support from some Democratic Party members including Alexandria Ocasio-Cortez, Karen Bass, Ilhan Omar, Pramila Jayapal and 30 Members of Congress. The bill has also received support from over 145 advocacy organizations and community representatives.

Opposition 
The bill has received strong opposition from the Republican Party on claims that it would increase crime and weaken the country. The bill would remove low-level drug crimes as deportable offenses and would require that certain criminal convictions come with a prison sentence of at least five years.

References

External links
Congress Bill

Immigration to the United States
United States immigration law
Proposed legislation of the 116th United States Congress
Proposed legislation of the 117th United States Congress